Samuel Jordan (died 1623) was an early settler and Ancient Planter of colonial Jamestown.  He arrived in Virginia around 1610, and served as a Burgess in the first representative legislative session in North America. Jordan patented a plantation known as Jordan's Journey (a.k.a. 'Beggar's Bush'), which became a safe haven and stronghold for settlers during the Second Anglo-Powhatan War that ensued after the Powhatan surprise attack of 1622. Jordan died in 1623. After his death, the control of Jordan's Journey was uncertain: his widow Cecily Jordan became involved in the first breach-of-promise dispute in North America, the suit filed by Rev. Greville Pooley.  Cecily Jordan won the case, then married William Farrar; her daughters with Jordan inherited Jordan's Journey.

Early life and arrival in New World
Samuel Jordan came to Virginia sometime around 1610, as his 1620 patent mentions him as having lived ten years in the colony.

Samuel Jordan's early life is uncertain. Alexander Brown suggests "he was probably married more than once". Some authors state that he had three sons from a first wife who were born in England: Robert, Samuel, and Thomas. Though the genealogist John Dorman does not mention either Robert or Samuel, he does acknowledge the possibility that Thomas Jordan, who arrived in Virginia at age 18 aboard Diana in 1619, could be Samuel's son from an earlier marriage in England; however, he also points out there is no conclusive evidence to establish this relation.

Role in Virginia government

When Deputy-Governor George Yeardley called the first representative legislative assembly in Virginia in 1619, Jordan served as a Burgess on behalf of Charles City. During this first meeting, Jordan also served on the committee of readers for the Great Charter, which been recently received from the Virginia Company and had authorized the assembly.  As a privilege granted by the Great Charter, Jordan also became an ancient planter, which entitled him to 100 acres of land.

Marriage to Cecily
Sometime before 1620, Jordan married Cecily, who had arrived in Virginia around 1611 and was around 18 when they married. {{notetag| Based on Jamestown muster of 1625, which gives Cecily's age as 24 at the time. By 1621, their first daughter Mary had been born, and when Jordan died in 1623, Cecily was pregnant with her second daughter, Margaret.

In 1620, Samuel Jordan officially received his patent for 450 acres of land.   This patent included 200 acres for both his and Cecily's claim as ancient planters, as well as an additional 250 acres as headright for paying the transportation costs to Virginia for five indentured servants.  Jordan's patent, located at today's Jordan Point, Virginia, was originally known as Beggars Bush and later as Jordan's Journey.

When the paramount chief Opechancanough of the Powhatan Confederacy launched the surprise attack of 1622 that killed nearly a third of the English colonists and triggered the Second Anglo-Powhatan War, nobody from Jordan's Journey was listed as killed.  Jordan's Journey withstood the attack and became a fortified refuge.  After the initial assault, many of the outlying settlements were temporarily abandoned, and most of the colonists were ordered to move to a small number of relatively safer settlements, one of which was Jordan's Journey. As a result, Jordan's Journey grew. In February 1624, 42 people were living at Jordan's Journey; a year later, 56 people were living there.

Death and aftermath

Samuel Jordan died sometime before mid-February 1623, as his name does not appear among living at Jordan's Journey in a list submitted to the Virginia Company that month. After he died, Cecily almost immediately became involved in a legal dispute that has been called the first breach-of-promise suit in North America. About three days after Jordan had died, Reverend Greville Pooley proposed marriage. By June 1623, Cecily had contracted herself to another man who was currently living at Jordan's Journey, William Farrar, who was bonded to execute Samuel Jordan's will.  Pooley took the case to the Virginia Council, claiming his proposal had initially been accepted. The outcome of this dispute not only determined who would marry Cecily, but also who would ultimately have say over the management of Jordan's property. After a prolonged period of litigation that lasted until 1625, when Pooley eventually forswore any claims against her. In 1625, Cecily Jordan and William Farrar married. Even though William Farrar had married Cecily, the lists of patents sent back to England still listed Jordan's Journey as owned by the Jordan family.  Farrar eventually acquired his own rights to a 2000 acre patent on Farrar's Island at the site of what had previously been Henricus,  Historian Martha McCartney suggests Jordan's Journey may have remained with one or both of Jordan's daughters, but their fates are not recorded.

Notes

References

1623 deaths
Virginia colonial people